The Naledi Theatre Awards are annual South African national theatre awards held in Gauteng launched in 2004 by Dawn Lindberg after the Vita Awards ended. Productions staged throughout the previous year are eligible, and the candidates are evaluated by the Naledi panel of judges.

Ceremonies

Regular categories
Play:

 Performance by a Female Actor in a Lead Role
 Performance by a Male Actor in a Lead Role
 Performance by a Female Actor in a Supporting Role
 Performance by a Male Actor in a Supporting Role
 Director
 Best Play

Musical:

 Performance by a Female Actor in a Lead Role
 Performance by a Male Actor in a Lead Role
 Performance by a Female Actor in a Supporting Role
 Performance by a Male Actor in a Supporting Role
 Director
 Best Musical
 Best Musical Revue
 Musical Direction
 Musical score / arrangement

Musical or Play:

 Breakthrough Performance
 Ensemble Performance
 Performance in a Solo Production
 Independent / Fringe Theatre Production
 Best New South African Script

Youth:

 Production for Children and Young Audiences
 Performance in a Production for Children and Young Audiences
 Tertiary Student / Incubator Theatre Production

Tech and design:

 Sound Design
 Lighting (LX) Design
 Set Design
 Costume / Props
 Animation / AV Design

Dance and choreography:

 Original Choreography
 Contemporary Dance or Ballet

Special categories
 Lifetime Achievement Award, for individuals with over 30 years experience in the industry
 Innovation in Theatre Award, for outstanding contribution to South African theatre
 World Impact Award, for individuals or productions that garner international recognition
 Lesedi Spirit of Courage Award, for individuals who have overcome extreme circumstances

References

Awards established in 2003
Events in Johannesburg
South African theatre awards